In English-speaking countries, the common verbal response to another person's sneeze is "[God] bless you", or, less commonly in the United States and Canada, "Gesundheit", the German word for health (and the response to sneezing in German-speaking countries).  There are several proposed bless-you origins for use in the context of sneezing.

In non-English-speaking cultures, words connoting good health or a long life are often used instead of "bless you," though some also use references to God.

In certain languages such as Mandarin Chinese, Vietnamese, Japanese or Korean, nothing is generally said after a sneeze except for when expressing concern when the person is sick from a cold or otherwise.

List of responses in other languages

See also 
 Photic sneeze reflex
 Snatiation

References

Explanatory notes

Further reading 
 Knowlson, T. Sharper (1910). "(19) SNEEZING". The Origins of Popular Superstitions and Customs, pp. 175–179. A book that lists many superstitions and customs that are still common today.
 Mikkelson, Barbara (2001). "Bless You!" Snopes.
 Stollznow, Karen (2014). God Bless You!' – A Blessing in Disguise?" Skeptic Magazine (19) 4.

External links 
 

Etiquette lists
Physiology
Sneeze